Loruk is a settlement in Kenya's Baringo County. It is a local centre for the pastoralist Pokot and agro-pastoralist Njemps people living around the Lake Baringo. The population size varies with the seasons but is estimated at 300–500. Loruk houses a primary school, a clinic, a number of churches and a police station.

References 

Populated places in Baringo County